Prostaglandin E3 (PGE3) is a naturally formed prostaglandin and is formed via the cyclooxygenase (COX) metabolism of eicosapentaenoic acid.

See also 
 Prostaglandin E1 (PGE1)
 Prostaglandin E2 (PGE2)

References 

Prostaglandins
Carboxylic acids
Secondary alcohols